This is a list of settlements in the Lefkada regional unit, Greece.

 Agios Ilias
 Agios Nikitas
 Agios Petros
 Alexandros
 Apolpaina
 Asprogerakata
 Athani
 Charadiatika
 Chortata
 Dragano
 Drymonas
 Egklouvi
 Evgiros
 Exatheia
 Fterno
 Kalamitsi
 Kalamos
 Kariotes
 Karya
 Kastos  
 Katochori
 Katomeri
 Katouna
 Kavallos
 Komili
 Kontaraina
 Lazarata
 Lefkada (city)
 Marantochori
 Neochori
 Nikolis
 Nydri
 Pigadisanoi
 Pinakochori
 Platystoma
 Poros
 Spanochori
 Spartochori
 Syvros
 Tsoukalades
 Vafkeri
 Vasiliki
 Vathy
 Vlycho
 Vournika

By municipality

See also
List of towns and villages in Greece

 
Lefkada